Matondo-Merveille Papela (born 18 January 2001) is a German footballer who plays as a central midfielder for  club SV Sandhausen on loan from Mainz 05.

Club career
Papela made his professional debut for Mainz 05 in the Bundesliga on 3 January 2021, coming on as a substitute in the 89th minute for Phillipp Mwene against Bayern Munich. The away match finished as a 5–2 loss.

On 24 August 2022, Papela joined SV Sandhausen on a season-long loan.

International career
Born in Germany, Papela is of Congolese descent. He has appeared for the Germany under-15 to under-18 and under-20 national teams. He was included in the Germany U17 team for the 2018 UEFA European Under-17 Championship in England. He made three appearances in the tournament, in which Germany were eliminated in the group stage.

References

External links
 
 
 
 

2001 births
Living people
Sportspeople from Mainz
Footballers from Rhineland-Palatinate
German footballers
Germany youth international footballers
German sportspeople of Democratic Republic of the Congo descent
Association football midfielders
1. FSV Mainz 05 II players
1. FSV Mainz 05 players
SV Sandhausen players
Bundesliga players
Regionalliga players